The Tomb of the Unknown Soldier is a war memorial located in Rome under the statue of the goddess Roma at the Altare della Patria. It is a sacellum dedicated to the Italian soldiers killed and missing during war.

It is the scene of official ceremonies that take place annually on the occasion of the Italian Liberation Day (April 25), the Italian Republic Day (June 2) and the National Unity and Armed Forces Day (November 4), during which the President of the Italian Republic and the highest offices of the State pay homage to the shrine of the Unknown Soldier with the deposition of a laurel wreath in memory of the fallen and missing Italians in the wars.

History

Choice of the body

The body of the Italian unknown soldier was chosen on 28 October 1921 in the Basilica of Aquileia by Maria Bergamas, the mother of Antonio Bergamas, an Italian irredentist volunteer in the Royal Italian Army whose body was not recovered during World War I. Maria Bergamas chose the body from among 11 unidentified bodies of members of the Italian Armed Forces whose remains had been retrieved from various areas of the front.

Maria Bergamas, after passing in front of the first few coffins, slumped to the ground in front of the tenth coffin and screamed her son's name: this was the chosen body. The other ten bodies remaining in Aquileia were buried in the military cemetery.

The chosen body made a journey from Aquileia to Rome by train passing through Udine, Treviso, Venice, Padua, Rovigo, Ferrara, Bologna, Pistoia, Prato, Florence, Arezzo, Chiusi and Orvieto, at a moderate speed, in each station the population could honor the Unknown Soldier.

Burial
The body was buried on November 4, 1921, at the Altare della Patria in Rome under the statue of the goddess Roma with a solemn ceremony, at which King Victor Emmanuel III was present as well as many veterans and war widows. The body was initially transported by some soldiers to the Basilica of St. Mary of the Angels and the Martyrs before being transferred, through a procession, to the Altare della Patria. 

The epigraph on the tomb at the Altare della Patria shows "" and dates "" (24 May 1915) and "" (4 November 1918), or the beginning and end of Italian participation in the First World War. The burial ceremony of the Unknown Soldier, which took place on November 4, 1921, was the most important and participatory patriotic demonstration of united Italy, given that a million people participated.

On November 1, on the initiative of deputy Giovanni Giuriati, to the Unknown Soldier was awarded Gold Medal of Military Valour, the highest Italian military decoration, with a motivation that was later also reported on the side of his sacellum which located inside the Altare della Patria, in the homonymous crypt:

On the front door of the internal crypt is present this epitaph, which was written by King Victor Emmanuel III:

Tomb 

Parts of the crypt and the sepulcher were made with stone materials from the mountains that were the scene of the battles of the First World War: the marble floor is from the Karst Plateau while the small altar was made of a single block of stone from Monte Grappa.

The tomb of the Unknown Soldier is always guarded by soldiers. The guard is provided with military personnel of the various branches of the Italian Armed Forces, which alternate every ten years. In 2011, from 29 October to 2 November, on the occasion of the celebrations for the 150th anniversary of the unification of Italy and of the 90th anniversary of the transfer of the body from Aquileia to Rome, there was the historical re-enactment of the journey by train of the Unknown Soldier.

It is the scene of official ceremonies that take place annually on the occasion of the Italian Liberation Day (April 25), the Italian Republic Day (June 2) and the National Unity and Armed Forces Day (November 4), during which the President of the Italian Republic and the highest offices of the State pay homage to the shrine of the Unknown Soldier with the deposition of a laurel wreath in memory of the fallen and missing Italians in the wars.

The reason for his strong symbolism lies in the metaphorical transition from the figure of the soldier to that of the people and finally to that of the nation: this transition between increasingly broader and generic concepts is due to the indistinct traits of the non-identification of the soldier.

His tomb is a symbolic shrine that represents all the fallen and missing in the war. The side of the tomb of the Unknown Soldier that gives outward at the Altare della Patria is always guarded by a guard of honor and two flames that burn perpetually in braziers. The guard is provided with military personnel of the various branches of the Italian Armed Forces, which alternate every ten years.

The allegorical meaning of the perpetually burning flames is linked to their symbolism, which is centuries old, since it has its origins in classical antiquity, especially in the cult of the dead. A fire that burns eternally symbolizes the memory, in this case of the sacrifice of the Unknown Soldier moved by patriotic love, and his everlasting memory of the Italians, even in those who are far from their country: not by chance on the two perennial braziers next to the Tomb of the Unknown Soldier is placed a plaque whose text reads "Italians Abroad to the Motherland" in memory of donations made by Italian emigrants between the end of the 19th century and the beginning of the 20th century for the construction of the Vittoriano.

Notes

Citations

References

External links
 
 
 
 

Tombs of Unknown Soldiers
Monuments and memorials in Rome
1921 establishments in Italy
Tombs in Italy